Eliseo Vidal (born 19 February 1951) is a Cuban former swimmer. He competed in two events at the 1968 Summer Olympics.

References

1951 births
Living people
Cuban male swimmers
Olympic swimmers of Cuba
Swimmers at the 1968 Summer Olympics
Sportspeople from Havana